Hollie Lo (born January 28, 1993) is a Canadian actress, best known for her role as Karena Eng in the movie Eve and the Fire Horse.

Awards
In 2006, Lo was nominated for a Leo Award for Best Supporting Performance by a Female in a Feature Length Drama in Eve and the Fire Horse (2005).

References

External links

Living people
1993 births
Canadian film actresses
Canadian actresses of Hong Kong descent